Yvonne Schnorf-Wabel (born 28 July 1965) is a road cyclist from Switzerland. She represented her nation at the 1996 Summer Olympics and 2000 Summer Olympics.

References

External links
 

Swiss female cyclists
Cyclists at the 2000 Summer Olympics
Cyclists at the 1996 Summer Olympics
Olympic cyclists of Switzerland
Living people
People from Meilen District
1965 births
Sportspeople from the canton of Zürich